Allan Marley (born 29 February 1956) is an English former professional footballer who played as a full-back.

References

1956 births
Living people
Sportspeople from Durham, England
Footballers from County Durham
English footballers
Association football fullbacks
Grimsby Town F.C. players
Louth United F.C. players
Brisbane City FC players
English Football League players